Portrait of Donny is the third studio album by the American singer Donny Osmond, released in 1972.  The album reached number six on the Billboard Top LPs chart on July 22, 1972. The album had two hit singles. "Puppy Love" reached number three on the Billboard Hot 100, while "Hey Girl" peaked at number nine.  The album was certified Gold by the RIAA on December 30, 1972.

Track listing

Charts

Certifications

References

1972 albums
Donny Osmond albums
Albums produced by Michael Lloyd (music producer)
MGM Records albums